Events in the year 2009 in Turkey.

Incumbents
President: Abdullah Gül 
Prime Minister: Recep Tayyip Erdoğan

Events
9 August – Mehmet Ali Şahin becomes Speaker of the Parliament of Turkey.
date unknown – Yazıcı Dam goes into service.

Arts and culture

Films
See List of Turkish films of 2009

Deaths
25 March – Muhsin Yazıcıoğlu, politician (born 1954; helicopter crash)
26 October – Orhan Onar, judge (born 1923
19 December – Zeki Ökten, film director (born 1942; heart failure)

References

 
Years of the 21st century in Turkey
2000s in Turkey
Turkey
Turkey
Turkey